James Cox (October 16, 1753 – September 12, 1810) was a member of the United States House of Representatives (from New Jersey) in the 11th Congress.

He was born in Monmouth, New Jersey (now Freehold Borough) on October 16, 1753, the son of Judge Joseph and Mary (Mount) Cox. He was an officer in the American Revolutionary War at the Battles of Brandywine, Germantown and Monmouth, and was elected Brigadier General of the Monmouth Brigade after the war. He was a member of the New Jersey General Assembly from 1801 to 1807 and was its speaker from 1804. He served as a Representative in the 11th United States Congress from 1809 until he died of a stroke on September 12, 1810 in Upper Freehold Township. He was buried in the Yellow Meeting House Cemetery in the Red Valley section of the township.

Family
James Cox married Ann Potts (1757–1815), daughter of William and Amy (Borden) Potts, on February 29, 1776. They were the parents of thirteen children, including Ezekiel Taylor Cox, who was a member of the Ohio State Senate and father of United States Representative Samuel Sullivan Cox.

See also
List of United States Congress members who died in office (1790–1899)
Coxs Corner, Monmouth County, New Jersey

References

External links
 Biographical Directory of the United States Congress
 General James Cox Chapter of the DAR
 

1753 births
1810 deaths
New Jersey militiamen in the American Revolution
People of New Jersey in the American Revolution
Members of the New Jersey General Assembly
Speakers of the New Jersey General Assembly
People from Upper Freehold Township, New Jersey
People of colonial New Jersey
Democratic-Republican Party members of the United States House of Representatives from New Jersey